Kocapınar, Elmalı is a village in the District of Elmalı, Antalya Province, Turkey.

References

Villages in Elmalı District